Gard Holtskog (born 1905, died 1987) was a Norwegian lawyer, and civil servant for the Nazi regime during the German occupation of Norway. He was installed as a board member at the Norwegian Broadcasting Corporation and at Nationaltheatret. He was later given the position of Police President of Finnmark, and assisted during the evacuation. He had an unpredictable behaviour. While in Finnmark he personally took part in torture and executions. During the legal purge he was sentenced to life in prison with hard labor, but was released in November 1957.

References

1905 births
Year of death missing
Norwegian jurists
Norwegian civil servants
Members of Nasjonal Samling
Norwegian police chiefs
People convicted of treason for Nazi Germany against Norway
Prisoners sentenced to life imprisonment by Norway
Norwegian prisoners sentenced to life imprisonment
Norwegian emigrants to Denmark